= Information creation =

Information creation may refer to:

- Information retrieval
- Content creation
